Hayq may refer to
Hayk‘, the native name of Armenia
H.A.Y.Q., Armenian rap band
Mets Hayq Recordz, Armenian rap band
Lake Hayq, Ethiopia
Hayq, Ethiopia a town near Lake Hayq